Zurandul (also Romanized as Zūrāndūl) is a village in Veysian Rural District, Veysian District, Dowreh County, Lorestan Province, Iran. At the 2006 census, its population was 229, in 60 families.

References 

Towns and villages in Dowreh County